P. Thangamani is an Indian politician and incumbent Member of the Legislative Assembly of Tamil Nadu from Kumarapalayam constituency. He was the minister of industry during 2011–16 elected from kumarapalayam constituency. Currently, he is elected from same constituency from 2016 and he was the Minister of power of the Government of Tamil Nadu till May 2021. As a cadre of Anna Dravida Munnetra Kazhagam, he was elected to the same Tiruchengode constituency in the 2006 elections.

References 

All India Anna Dravida Munnetra Kazhagam politicians
Living people
State cabinet ministers of Tamil Nadu
1994 births
People from Karur district
Tamil Nadu MLAs 2006–2011
Tamil Nadu MLAs 2011–2016
Tamil Nadu MLAs 2016–2021
Tamil Nadu MLAs 2021–2026